is a Japanese composer. His work includes the Studio Ghibli films Whisper of the Heart (1995) and The Cat Returns (2002), as well as the Kyoto Animation television series Nichijou (2011). His mentor was Ryuichi Sakamoto, whom he helped with Royal Space Force: The Wings of Honnêamise and The Last Emperor (both 1987).

Early life

Nomi dropped out of Chuo University, after which he began to study painting.

Filmography

Film
The Adventures of Milo and Otis (live-action, 1986) - Assistant composer and arranger
Royal Space Force: The Wings of Honnêamise (animation, 1987)
The Last Emperor (live-action, 1987) - Additional music arrangement
Whisper of the Heart (animation, 1995)
Kujiratori (animation, 2001)
Koro no Daisanpo (animation, 2002)
The Cat Returns (animation, 2002)
Love Me, Love Me Not (manga) (animation, 2020)

Television
Hanayome wa 16-sai! (1995)
Doku (live-action, 1996)
DxD (live-action, 1997)
NHK Special: Uchu Michi éno Daikikou (documentary, 2001)
Seizon LifE (live-action, 2002)
Hannari Kikutaro (live-action, 2002)
NHK Special: Nankyoku Daikikou (documentary, 2003)
Hannari Kikutaro 2 (live-action, 2004)
Phoenix (animation, 2004)
Bokurano (animation, 2007)
Nichijou (animation, 2011)
Say "I Love You." (animation, 2012)

Games
Mansion of Hidden Souls (1994) - Composer and arranger (one of three)
Four-sight (1995) - Composer and arranger

Discography
Oshare TV (1986)
Fantasia (1994)

Collaborations

Fantastic World 11: Megumi Wakatsuki no Takarabune World (1987)
Fantastic World 16: Please Save My Earth (1988)
Fantastic World 18: Here Is Greenwood (1989)
Wangan Trial Original Soundtrack (1997)

Writings 
"Nonki katsu Kakoku na Eiga-Ongaku" in Ozu Yasujiro Taizen (The Complete Book of Ozu Yasujiro) by Matsuura Kanji and Miyamoto Akiko (Asahi Shimbun Publications Inc. 2019)

References

External links
The Yuji Nomi Web Site

1958 births
Anime composers
Japanese film score composers
Japanese male film score composers
Living people